The University Endowment Lands (UEL) is an unincorporated area that lies to the west of the city of Vancouver, British Columbia, Canada, and adjacent to the University of British Columbia (UBC) and the lands associated with that campus.  Pacific Spirit Regional Park lies within the UEL. The UEL is part of Metro Vancouver. Mail sent to the UEL is addressed to "Vancouver" rather than the UEL.

The UEL is administered directly by the province and landowners pay their property taxes directly to the provincial government. In a 1995 referendum, UEL residents voted against establishing a municipal governing body.

Geography
The University Endowment Lands are located immediately west of the City of Vancouver. About half of the UEL is made up of Pacific Spirit Regional Park, a mostly forested land that was originally set aside for development which never materialized. Located on Point Grey, the UEL also boasts tall cliffs near the water, with steep drops of approximately  down to the beaches below.

Because of its isolated location and the nature of the steep cliffs next to the beaches, Greater Vancouver's only nude beaches are located in the University Endowment Lands, the best known being Wreck Beach, located near the western tip of the peninsula.

Climate

Because the UEL is close to seaside cliffs and the Strait of Georgia, above-average winds are common. Most of the winds come from the Strait itself, Howe Sound and English Bay.

Snowfalls are also more common than many parts of the City of Vancouver because of the area's higher altitude and the lack of an urban heat island due to less terrestrial development.

The UEL has higher humidity compared to other parts of Greater Vancouver because it is surrounded on three sides by water. Fog is common in the winter months, especially in areas near Pacific Spirit Park and the water.

History
The territory was originally held by the Musqueam Indian Band which still lays claim to the area.

The creation of the University Endowment Lands was first proposed after the passing of the University Endowment Act of 1907, in which the British Columbia provincial government agreed to set aside two million acres (8,000 km2) of British Columbia Crown land to be sold or leased to fund the creation of a university. This land was to be in the Cariboo region of the province's Interior, and consisted of mostly agricultural land. This idea was changed in 1911 when the provincial government passed the University Site Act, which set aside  in Point Grey for the university. This is where the UEL is located today.

By 1920, it was realized that the Cariboo land did not have a high enough market value to generate the income needed for the university, so that idea was abandoned. This led to the British Columbia University Loan Act, which allowed the Lieutenant-Governor to sell 3,000 acres (12 km2) of Crown land on Point Grey for residential development. The money from the auction was put in the University Endowment Account for the university.

However, a lot of the development that was planned was halted due to economic hardships stemming from the Great Depression. The university could not afford to prepare the land for development or to clear the forest land for development. In the 1930s, the university returned control of the land to the government. By the mid-1950s, over half of the undeveloped land in the UEL remained undeveloped due to the Depression and war shortages in the 1940s.

There have been many attempts to develop this land, which was then opposed by environmentally aware residents in the area. In 1988, the creation of Pacific Spirit Park was announced by the provincial Premier Bill Vander Zalm. The park currently makes up of over half of the UEL, acting as a greenbelt between the developed areas and the City of Vancouver. Development, in large part, is very limited; for any proposed developments in the UEL by the Greater Vancouver Regional District or the University of British Columbia, the following groups must be consulted beforehand: university students, university staff, university faculty, environmental groups, businesses, residents and the general public.

Demographics

In the 2021 census the University Endowment Lands had an official permanent population of 3,193.

The University Endowment Lands' residential population is small and the non-university population includes mostly high-income professionals as the land there is very expensive. The other residents are mostly students living in the university's residences.

Government and politics
An unincorporated entity, the UEL has no mayor or municipal government. Rather, it is mostly governed by the University of British Columbia, the Metro Vancouver Regional District (MVRD) and the Province of British Columbia, and they control three entities: the University of British Columbia, University Hill and Pacific Spirit Regional Park. It is part of Electoral Area A of the GVRD.

Residential and commercial taxes are paid directly to the provincial government.

UEL residents are eligible to vote only for school board trustees in City of Vancouver municipal elections.

For provincial elections, the UEL falls under the Vancouver-Point Grey electoral riding.  The current Member of the Legislative Assembly is David Eby.

For federal elections, the UEL is in the Vancouver Quadra electoral riding. The seat is held by Joyce Murray.

Neighbourhoods

The UEL is made up of four neighbourhood areas:
 Area A is bordered by Chancellor Boulevard, Acadia Road, University Boulevard and Wesbrook Mall. 
 Area B lies between Chancellor Boulevard and NW Marine Drive.
 Area C is between Blanca Street, West 6th Avenue, Tasmania Crescent and College Highroad. 
 Area D is bordered by University Boulevard, Agronomy and Toronto Roads, Wesbrook Mall and includes Block F.

Transportation

Pacific Spirit Regional Park, at the eastern end of the Endowment Lands, creates a physical buffer between the University and the adjacent Vancouver neighbourhoods of West Point Grey and Dunbar. Because of this, there are only five roads leading from Vancouver into the UEL: North West Marine Drive, 4th Avenue/Chancellor Boulevard, 10th Avenue/University Boulevard, 16th Avenue, and South West Marine Drive.

However, the large number of students and staff commuting to UBC on a daily basis means that the area is easily accessible by public transit. UBC Exchange is the western terminus of many TransLink bus routes, and the bus system is heavily used due to a discount bus pass system called U-Pass. The following routes service the UEL and UBC:

 #4 – UBC/Downtown/Powell
 #9 – UBC / Alma / Granville / Commercial–Broadway Station / Boundary 
 #14 – UBC/Hastings
 #25 – UBC / Brentwood Station
 #33 – UBC / 29th Avenue Station
 #R4 – UBC / Joyce Station 
 #44 – UBC/Downtown 
 #49 – UBC / Dunbar Loop / Metrotown Station
 #68 – UBC / Wesbrook Village
 #84 – UBC / VCC–Clark Station 
 #99 B-Line – UBC / Commercial–Broadway Station 
 #258 – UBC / West Vancouver 
 #480 – UBC / Bridgeport Station 
 #N17 – UBC/Downtown

Economy
The UEL is largely a residential neighbourhood, and most economic activity is centred at the University of British Columbia and the area around University Village and University Marketplace. UBC's stores are located mostly in the Student Union Building ("the SUB"). The Village and Marketplace, located next to each other near the intersection of University Boulevard and Allison Road, are located off-campus and home to a food court, several restaurants, some shops, some medical clinics and some services.

The eastern end of the UEL is home to the University Golf Course, which is one of the original developments in the non-campus portions of the UEL.

Wreck Beach is also a popular area for locals and tourists alike due to its reputation as one of the largest clothing optional beaches in North America.  A thriving market in food, drink, clothing, personal services and various recreational substances has prospered on the beach for decades.

Commercial centres

University Village
The University Village is the first commercial structure built on the UEL. Its main level mostly includes a convenience store, a McDonald's restaurant, a photocopying store and a florist.

The second level is home to a Japanese restaurant, a salon, a pizza parlour and a discount textbook store (which is in direct competition with UBC Bookstore, located on campus).

The basement level is entirely dedicated to a multicultural-themed food court, including Chinese, Japanese, Indian, Middle Eastern, etc.

University Marketplace
The University Marketplace is a mixed commercial-residential structure completed around the late 1990s to the early 2000s. The main floor is home to Rogers Wireless, Staples Business Depot, Starbucks, several restaurants, some cafes and others.

The second floor of the Marketplace contains mostly offices and medical clinics. Some professors from UBC (especially those in the medical field) have offices located there, likely due to the proximity of the science buildings and UBC Hospital.

The upper floors of the Marketplace contain mostly residential apartment housing.

Education

The UEL is adjacent to the University of British Columbia (hence the name "University Endowment Lands"), the Vancouver School of Theology and Regent College.

In addition, the UEL is served by the Vancouver School Board and is zoned to University Hill Secondary School and University Hill Elementary School.

Emergency services and public safety
Police
Unlike neighbouring City of Vancouver, which is under the jurisdiction of Vancouver Police Department, the UEL is under the jurisdiction of the Royal Canadian Mounted Police (RCMP) University detachment because of its Provincial Crown Land status.
Fire and rescue
The UEL is served by the Vancouver Fire and Rescue Services under contract.
Ambulance
Ambulance service is provided by British Columbia Ambulance Service, as is the entire province.
Emergency social services
Organized and provided by the UBC Emergency Planning Office, Department of Health Safety and Environment.
Health care facilities
UBC Hospital Urgent Care Centre is the closest hospital. However, for serious symptoms like chest pain, abdominal pain, difficulty breathing or stroke, patients will be transferred to the Vancouver General Hospital.
 If children or women require specialty services, they will be transferred to BC Children's Hospital or BC Women's Hospital & Health Centre.

Surrounding municipalities

See also

Vancouver School of Theology
Regent College

References

External links

University Endowment Lands Homepage
University Endowment Land Act

Discover Vancouver – University Endowment Lands
University Marketplace

 
Unincorporated settlements in British Columbia
Geography of Vancouver
Education in British Columbia
University of British Columbia